Picton  is a small town in the Macarthur Region of New South Wales, Australia, in the Wollondilly Shire, in south-western Sydney. The town is located approximately 90 kilometres south-west of Sydney, close to Camden and Campbelltown. It is also the administrative centre of Wollondilly Shire.

History
Picton was first explored by Europeans in 1798 and remained beyond the limits of legal settlement until 1821.  Following the discovery of good land in the interior and the settlement of Bong Bong and the Goulburn areas, Governor Macquarie authorised the building of the new Great South Road between Sydney and the Southern Highlands in 1819.   This opened up the Picton area to settlers, including Henry Colden Antill, who established a  property in 1822.

Picton developed when a new line of the Great South Road was cut over the Razorback Range from Camden, and especially after the railway arrived in 1863. Picton is the only town in the Southern Hemisphere that one can pass through twice (see Picton railway station) when travelling by train.  It was established as Stonequarry in 1841 and was renamed Picton in 1845.  It was named for Sir Thomas Picton, a British army officer (noted for cruelty) who died at the Battle of Waterloo. It remained a stopping point on the Great South Road, later renamed the Hume Highway, until it was bypassed in December 1980.

One house was destroyed by bushfire in the Nangarin Estate located on the western outskirts of Picton, from a fire front originating from Lakesland in September 2006.

Heritage listings 
Picton has a number of heritage-listed sites, including:
 Hume Highway Deviation: Jarvisfield
 Main Southern railway: Picton railway station
 Main Southern railway: Stonequarry Creek railway viaduct, Picton
 Oaks Road: Abbotsford
 Prince Street: Victoria Bridge, Picton

Landmarks
Picton is home to many historic buildings, including two types of bridges not found easily anymore elsewhere in the state - Victoria Bridge a timber trestle bridge that crosses Stonequarry Creek, opened in 1897, and the 'Picton Railway Viaduct' a stone viaduct opened in 1863 to also cross Stonequarry Creek.

The viaduct is still in use by the railways. Ghost tours are conducted in some of the historic buildings and inside the disused railway tunnel on Redbank Range, where residents and visitors claim to have experienced paranormal activity. The abandoned tunnel was used to store mustard gas spray tanks during World War II.

The George IV Inn, reputedly constructed in 1839, is considered to be one of the oldest hotel buildings in Australia. The cellar contains remnants of convict shackles as prisoners being transported from Sydney to Berrima prison would often be held in Picton overnight. The barn behind the hotel may date back to 1810 and is possibly the oldest building in Picton - it is used for functions such as birthday and engagement parties. The hotel is also the location of Scharer's Little Brewery, one of the first microbreweries in Australia and winner of numerous awards for its Burragorang Bock and Scharer's Lager beers.

Nangarin Estate
Nangarin Vineyard Estate or simply Nangarin Estate is a modern village to the west and part of Picton.  The estate is one of New South Wales' first residential vineyard projects. The village community manages and maintains the vineyards, residential construction and community facilities. The village is protected by legal covenants to ensure the community manages the village.

Population
According to the 2016 census of Population, there were 4,816 people in Picton.
 Aboriginal and Torres Strait Islander people made up 2.4% of the population. 
 81.1% of people were born in Australia. The next most common country of birth was England at 4.6%.   
 89.4% of people only spoke English at home. 
 The most common responses for religion were Catholic 27.6%, Anglican 26.7%, No Religion 23.7%, and Picton 12.4%

Transport
Picton railway station is on the Southern Highlands line with a relatively infrequent service with trains running every 30m (peak) – 2 hours (off peak).

The town is located on the Old Hume Highway.

Sport and recreation
Picton also has both senior and junior rugby league and soccer teams. And Picton Netball Club has teams for all age groups. Meanwhile, the Picton Photography Club, called Depictin' Picton, meets every other Saturday to share photos of the local area taken by residents.

The Picton Botanical Gardens were established in 1986.

Climate
Picton has a humid subtropical climate (Cfa) with hot summers and cool winters. Owing to its inland location in a valley, it has a relatively high diurnal range throughout the year.

See also
 Jarvisfield, Picton

References

External links 

Picton - SYDNEY.com

 
Towns in the Macarthur (New South Wales)
Wollondilly Shire